The Red Emperor or Red Deity (赤帝 Chìdì) was a legendary ancient Chinese ruler in pre-dynastic times.

Red Emperor or red emperor may also refer to:

 Emperor (grape), a red grape variety also known as Red Emperor
 Lutjanus sebae, a species of fish, also known as red emperor
 Mao Zedong (1893–1976), chairman of the Central Committee of the Communist Party of China, sometimes called the Red Emperor
 "Red Emperor", a cultivar of the tulip Tulipa fosteriana